A computer virus hoax is a message warning the recipients of a non-existent computer virus threat. The message is usually a chain e-mail that tells the recipients to forward it to everyone they know, but it can also be in the form of a pop-up window.

Identification
Most hoaxes are sensational in nature and easily identified by the fact that they indicate that the virus will do nearly impossible things, like blow up the recipient's computer and set it on fire, or less sensationally, delete everything on the user's computer. They often include fake announcements claimed to originate from reputable computer organizations together with mainstream news media. These bogus sources are quoted in order to give the hoax more credibility. Typically, the warnings use emotive language, stress the urgent nature of the threat and encourage readers to forward the message to other people as soon as possible.

Virus hoaxes are usually harmless and accomplish nothing more than annoying people who identify it as a hoax and wasting the time of people who forward the message. Nevertheless, a number of hoaxes have warned users that vital system files are viruses and encourage the user to delete the file, possibly damaging the system. Examples of this type include the jdbgmgr.exe virus hoax and the SULFNBK.EXE hoax.

Some consider virus hoaxes and other chain e-mails to be a computer worm in and of themselves. They replicate by social engineering—exploiting users' concern, ignorance, and disinclination to investigate before acting.

Hoaxes are distinct from computer pranks, which are harmless programs that perform unwanted and annoying actions on a computer, such as randomly moving the mouse, turning the screen display upside down, etc.

Action
Anti-virus specialists agree that recipients should delete virus hoaxes when they receive them, instead of forwarding them.

McAfee says:

F-Secure recommends:

Comparison

Telephone scam

A telephone scam, commonly operated from call centres based in India, has been active since 2008. The victim is quoted his or her name and address, and is told: "I'm calling for Microsoft (or an entity that sounds like it is connected to Microsoft, such as the "Windows Service Center" or "Windows Technical Department"). We've had a report from your internet service provider of serious virus problems from your Windows computer." The victim is then directed to open the Windows event viewer, which displays apparently critical warnings, and is directed to a website to download an application to allow the scammer to control his or her computer remotely.  The caller supposedly fixes the problems and demands a fee for the service.  In addition to the fraudulent fee, the process usually enables malware to be uploaded to the victim's computer.

Parodies
The virus hoax has become part of the culture of the twenty-first century and the gullibility of novice computer users convinced to delete files on the basis of hoaxes has been parodied in several popular jokes and songs.

One such parody is "Weird Al" Yankovic's song "Virus Alert" from the album Straight Outta Lynwood. The song makes fun of the exaggerated claims that are made in virus hoaxes, such as legally changing your name or opening a rift in time and space.

Another parody of virus hoaxes is the honor system virus which has been circulated under the name Amish Computer Virus, manual virus, the Blond Computer Virus, the Irish Computer Virus, the Syrian Computer Virus, the Norwegian Computer Virus, Albanian Virus, Newfie Virus, the Unix Computer Virus, the Mac OS 9 virus, Discount virus and many others. This joke email claims to be authored by the Amish or other similar low-technology populations who have no computers, programming skills or electricity to create viruses and thus ask users to delete their own hard drive contents manually after forwarding the message to their friends.

The Tuxissa virus is another parody of the virus hoax, based on the concept of the Melissa virus, but with its aim of installing Linux on the victim's computer without the owner's permission. The story says that it was spread via e-mail, contained in a message titled "Important Message About Windows Security". It was supposed to first spread the virus to other computers, then download a stripped-down version of Slackware and uncompress it onto the hard disk. The Windows Registry is finally deleted and the boot options changed. The virus then reboots the computer, leaving the user facing the Linux login prompt with all their Windows security problems solved.

See also

 Malware
 Comparison of computer viruses
 List of trojan horses
 Timeline of notable computer viruses and worms

References

External links
 McAfee virus hoaxes
 Symantec Threat Explorer
 Trend Micro Virus Encyclopedia

 
Computer viruses
Computer security exploits
Email
Types of malware